Trouble with the Curve is a 2012 American sports drama film directed by Robert Lorenz and starring Clint Eastwood, Amy Adams, Justin Timberlake, Matthew Lillard, and John Goodman. The film revolves around an aging baseball scout whose daughter joins him on a scouting trip. Filming began in March 2012, and the film was released on September 21, 2012.

This was Eastwood's first acting project since 2008's Gran Torino and his first acting role in a film he did not direct since his cameo in 1995's Casper. A year after its release, the film became the subject of a plagiarism lawsuit by a producer alleging that his former partner had taken an unfinished script after a dispute and conspired with his agent and Warner Bros. to present it as the work of a relative unknown.

Plot 
Aging Atlanta Braves baseball scout Gus Lobel's last assignment is to scout, proving his value to the organization. He's viewed as unadaptable to changes within the game, especially advanced statistical analysis. His boss and friend Pete does not want to let him go, but is contending with ambitious junior executive Phillip Sanderson, vying for the general manager post who feels Gus is an obstacle.

Pete suspects Gus is hiding health problems so, behind his back, Pete contacts Gus's daughter Mickey, a workaholic lawyer pursuing partnership in her firm, to join her father on a scouting trip to North Carolina. Gus is to review top prospect Bo Gentry, whose gaudy statistics make him a likely top draft pick.

Mickey realizes Gus's sight is failing, so she actively helps to make up for his shortcoming. Along the way, he reconnects with a former player he once scouted, Johnny "The Flame" Flanagan, now a scout for the Boston Red Sox, who is interested in Mickey. The Red Sox have the top pick in the draft, just ahead of the Braves, and Johnny is also scouting Bo Gentry.

Mickey asks Gus why he left her with an uncle she barely knew as a child after her mother died. He explains that, on a scouting trip, a child molester approached her. Gus prevented anything from happening, nearly beating the man to death. Afterwards, he felt that always being on the road as a scout meant he couldn't protect Mickey properly. She tells him keeping her away was worse, blaming him for her long chain of poor relationships with potential suitors. She then walks away, leaving Gus frustrated.

As Gus and Mickey watch Bo play with other scouts present, they use Gus's hearing and Mickey's sight to review him. Spotting a problem with his ability to hit a curveball, Gus advises Johnny to pass on Bo in the draft not explaining why, and Johnny takes his advice. However, when he gives Pete and the Braves' management the same advice, Phillip disagrees, showing his statistical analysis as proof that Bo should be drafted. He doubles down by staking his career on the decision to sign Bo, leading Braves general manager Vince to draft him. When Johnny learns of the move, he incorrectly believes that Gus and Mickey double-crossed him to allow the Braves to draft Bo and leaves angrily.

After yet another argument Gus abandons Mickey at the hotel. While waiting on a ride back to her life she hears a pitcher throwing outside her room and realizes he is talented just from the sound. She approaches the young man, Rigoberto, and volunteers to catch for him. After seeing him throw a few curveballs, she realizes he is a baseball prospect so she calls Pete, who reluctantly agrees to have him attend a tryout in Atlanta.

Returning to the Braves' office, Vince and Phillip criticize Gus for his evaluation of Bo. Pete interrupts to let them know Mickey has brought Rigo to the field. As Bo practices batting, Phillip mocks Gus and Mickey for bringing in Rigo, an unknown. Bo remembers Rigo selling peanuts at a high school game, and also mocks him. Regardless, Mickey insists they allow Rigo to pitch. He throws several fastballs, which Bo repeatedly misses, then Mickey asks him to throw his curve, and again Bo cannot connect with the ball on three straight attempts. Gus triumphantly proclaims he has a problem with curveballs, why he was against signing him. Everyone realizes they were wrong about both Bo and Gus.

Management resumes their meeting, intent on signing Rigo. When Pete asks who can represent Rigo, Gus immediately suggests Mickey could be Rigo's sports agent, due to her legal background and knowledge of the game. When Phillip makes another snide remark to Gus, Vince fires him and offers Gus a contract extension. Mickey then gets a partnership offer from her firm, but declines it by throwing her phone away. Outside the stadium, Mickey and Gus find Johnny waiting. Mickey approaches him and they kiss while Gus lights a cigar and walks away.

Cast

Production

Filming 
Filming began in Georgia in March 2012.

Locations included:
 Georgia Tech
 Atlanta: Virginia-Highland neighborhood including George's restaurant.
 Turner Field, home of the Atlanta Braves.
 Macon, Georgia, Luther Williams Field, former home of the Macon Braves
 Dawsonville: Amicalola Lodge
 Young Harris: Young Harris College baseball fields 
 Athens: College Ave & Clayton streets 
 Dunwoody High School: Baseball Fields
 Jasper, Georgia
 Swannanoa, North Carolina
 Marion, North Carolina

Release

Critical response 
On review aggregation website Rotten Tomatoes the film has an approval rating of 51% based on 204 reviews, with a rating average of 5.60/10. The site's critical consensus reads, "Though predictable and somewhat dramatically underwhelming, Trouble with the Curve benefits from Clint Eastwood's grizzled charisma and his easy chemistry with a charming Amy Adams." On Metacritic, the film has a score of 58 out of 100 based on reviews from 40 critics, indicating "mixed or average reviews".  Audiences polled by CinemaScore gave the film an average grade of "B+" on an A+ to F scale.

Box office
In its opening weekend, Trouble with the Curve ranked third in the box office, grossing $12.2 million. In its first week in theaters, it ranked second with $16,195,962. It remained in the top ten over the next two weeks with $31,218,109. However, the results at the box office were subsequently low.  In twelve weeks, Trouble with the Curve grossed $35,763,137 in the United States, where it was distributed to 3,212 theaters. At the worldwide box office, the film grossed $48,963,137 which is the second lowest take for a film featuring Clint Eastwood as an actor, just ahead of Blood Work ($31,794,718 in worldwide box office). In January 2013, the film was nominated for Best Intergenerational Story at the AARP Movies for Grownups Awards, but lost to Silver Linings Playbook.

Home media
Trouble with the Curve was released on DVD and Blu-ray on December 18, 2012.

Plagiarism lawsuit

A year after the film's release, another producer, Ryan Brooks, filed a lawsuit in federal district court against Warner, the producers, two talent agencies, screenwriter Brown and Don Handfield, an actor and former partner of Brooks. He alleged copyright infringement and conspiracy, claiming the produced screenplay of the film bore striking similarities to Omaha, an unproduced screenplay he had commissioned from Handfield that had as its main character an older college baseball coach working through a difficult relationship with his grown daughter, as well as other plot elements.

Brooks, a former minor league baseball player himself, claimed that Handfield took the unfinished Omaha script with him after the two had a falling out over a rewrite. Handfield then, Brooks claims, conspired with Charles Ferraro, his agent at United Talent, to present it—with minor alterations such as changing the setting from college baseball to the major leagues—as the work of Brown, a fellow client of Ferraro with only two minor credits to his name who had primarily worked as a musician. Brooks' suit claimed that Brown's interviews to promote the film seemed rehearsed and frustrating to interviewers trying to understand how he created the film, and questioned how an unknown writer in his fifties managed to land the well-connected Ferraro as an agent.

All the named defendants who spoke to the media about the claims, including Brown, denied and derided them. Warner responded with a letter to Brooks' lawyer threatening serious legal actions in response if he did not withdraw the "reckless and false" complaint within a week. Attached to it was a draft of the Trouble with the Curve script, credited to Brown, that had purportedly been optioned by another production company in 1998. Brooks' lawyer questioned its authenticity to The New York Times suggesting that it bore signs of fabrication, such as the anachronistic use of wireless laptops, and that there was no record of it having been registered with the Writers Guild of America, a common practice for screenwriters establishing authorship of their work before getting a production company interested.

Lawyers for the studio responded with a motion for summary judgement in their favor and presented evidence that they claimed proved Brown had written the first drafts of the script as early as 1996, including an affidavit from a computer forensics expert authenticating the timestamps on a floppy disk containing those early drafts. Brooks' lawyers called all of the evidence of earlier creation forged or tampered with, in addition to calling attention to anachronistic passages in those purported earlier drafts. In February 2014 Dale S. Fischer, the judge hearing the case, granted the motion, saying that Brooks had overstated the similarities between the two scripts and that, even if he hadn't, "the idea of a father-daughter baseball story is not protectable as a matter of copyright law."

Two months later Fischer dismissed the remaining claims under federal law, but said claims under state law could still be filed in state court. Brooks appealed his decision to the Ninth Circuit Court of Appeals, and in October refiled the case in Los Angeles County Superior Court. This time he alleged only breach of contract and did not name either Warner or Eastwood as defendants, as he had in the original claim. He demanded $5 million in damages.

References

External links 

 
 
 

2012 films
2010s sports drama films
2010s romance films
American baseball films
American sports drama films
Atlanta Braves
Films about old age
Films scored by Marco Beltrami
Films set in Atlanta
Films set in Georgia (U.S. state)
Films set in North Carolina
Films shot in Atlanta
Films shot in Georgia (U.S. state)
Malpaso Productions films
Films directed by Robert Lorenz
Films involved in plagiarism controversies
Films produced by Clint Eastwood
Films produced by Robert Lorenz
2012 directorial debut films
2012 drama films
2010s English-language films
2010s American films
Films about Major League Baseball